Flextime (also spelled flexitime (BE) or flex-time) is a flexible hours schedule that allows workers to alter their workday and decide/adjust their start and finish times. In contrast to traditional work arrangements that require employees to work a standard 9a.m. to 5p.m. day, flextime typically involves a "core" period of the day during which employees are required to be at work (e.g., between 11a.m. and 3p.m.), and a "bandwidth" period within which all required hours must be worked (e.g., between 5:30 a.m. and 7:30 p.m.). The working day outside of the "core" period is "flexible time", in which employees can choose when they work, subject to achieving total daily, weekly or monthly hours within the "bandwidth" period set by employers, and subject to the necessary work being done. The total working time required of employees on flextime schedules is the same as that required under traditional work schedules.

A flextime policy allows staff to determine when they will work, while a flexplace policy allows staff to determine where they will work. Advantages include allowing employees to coordinate their work hours with public transport schedules, with the schedules of their children, and with daily traffic patterns to avoid high congestion times such as rush hour. Some claim that flexible working will change the nature of the way we work. The idea of flextime was invented by Christel Kammerer and Wilhelm Haller. The World Health Organization and the International Labour Organization estimate that over 745,000 people die from ischemic heart disease or stroke annually worldwide because they have worked 55 hours or more per week, making long working hours the occupational hazard with the largest disease burden.

From practitioners' viewpoint 
The industrial perspective of flexible working emphasizes the practical definition of flexibility. Employees being allowed to work from many different places as long as their level of production is maintained if not increased. Moreover, research reports gave quantitative interpretation backed by statistical evidences showing the changing attitude of organisations in different countries and especially the UK toward flexible working. For example, 50% of companies in the UK started to consider flexible working as a common practice and 73% of the managers in the survey showed an ultimate support to it. On the other hand, employees showed great preference to flexible working to the point that 40% of workers in the UK choose it over salary. Also, greater focus was put to explain the increased demand for such arrangements by both stakeholders which was clarified by their advantages of contributing to high quality of output results while creating the perfect working conditions for workers.

Additionally, as seen recently, most business organisations have started to introduce flexible working patterns for their employee as a way to increase their productivity level, increasing profitability. Flexible working is also seen as a family-friendly policy, which leads to a good work–life balance for employees. Some examples of organisations with flexible working arrangement include Agilent technologies, NetApp, Qualcomm Inc.

Flexible working arrangements may be a way for organisations to expand and increase their operations nationally and internationally at lower cost, in comparison to permanent or non-flexible working arrangements. While both employees and employers acknowledge the benefits of flexible working, drawbacks might include extra expenses and responsibilities the organization could incur in order to provide these arrangements and the decreased benefits offered to employee in accordance to their reduced working hours.

Empirical evidence 
Flexible working was academically introduced in 1970 (Google Ngram Viewer) and since then this topic continues to be the interest of many research papers.

For four decades, academic papers have contributed to the increased knowledge and interest in flexible working. A descriptive background of the evolution of the concept of flexibility as well as highlighting the main factors contributed to its growth were the main focus of academic studies. Also, they deliver evidence of the significant amount and the ongoing increase in the use of flexible working in many countries.

Studies examining who gets access to flexitime have shown that it is the high skilled/educated workers, in higher occupational jobs, and supervisory roles that are most likely to have access. Unlike what many assume, women do not have better access to flexitime arrangements, and female-dominated workplaces have worse access to flexitime compared to workplaces where there are more men or equal number of men and women. Many studies examine the outcomes of flexible working. For example, a study by Origo and Pagani based on a sample of European countries, gave a deep analysis of the concept of flexible working by testing the level of heterogeneity in the effect of flexibility on job satisfaction and found some positive link with some aspects of the job while negative or no relation was found against other aspects. There is increasing evidence for the "business case" of flexible working. A meta analysis of studies have shown that flexible working can provide a wide range of benefits for companies, including increase in performance, productivity, and reduction in absenteeism etc.

Flexible working can both prevent and create opportunities. There is generally a positive relationship between flexible working and perceptions of job quality in term of work–life balance and helping to improve and control autonomy particularly for remote workers, but some factors such as opportunities for advancement will be negatively affected due to the variations on different dimensions of job quality. Flexible working has also been linked to increased recruitment and retention of workers. Chung and van der Horst have shown that the use of flexitime significantly reduces the likelihood of mothers decreasing their working hours after childbirth, and reduces the likelihood of first time mothers leaving their work altogether. Flexible employment is one of the vital factors in the European Union policy discourse. It is a means to reduce unemployment, increase economic and social cohesion, maintain economic competitiveness and enhance equal opportunities between women and men. However, flexible working is not without problems. Studies have also shown that flexible working can lead to an increase in overtime hours.

The European Commission 
In 2017, the European Commission proposed the Directive on Work–Life Balance which includes the extension of the right to request flexible working arrangements (reduced working hours, flexible working hours and flexibility in place of work) to all working parents of children up to 12 and carers with dependent relatives. It also includes non legislative measures ensuring protection against discrimination and dismissal for parents (including pregnant women and workers coming back from a leave) and carers, and encouraging a gender-balanced use of family-related leaves and flexible working arrangements.

United Kingdom 
Haller founded a company in the UK in 1971 and registered the trademark "Flextime", the mark remains the property of that company's successor hfx Ltd.
In spring 2003, 17.7% of men and 26.7% of women were employed with flexitime arrangements in the United Kingdom, (Office for National Statistics 2003). In the United Kingdom, flexitime working is commonplace in both the private and public sectors. The practice is often found in administrative and back office functions of commercial organisations and local councils.

In 2003, the UK Government introduced legislation that gave parents of children under 6, or the parents of disabled children under 18, the right in law to request a flexible working arrangement from their employer. A survey in 2005 by the National Office of Statistics showed that 71% of female workers and 60% of male workers were aware of the rights created under the 2003 legislation. Between 2003 and 2005 more than 14% of all workers had requested a change to flexible working. Since April 2007 the right to request flexible working also applies to carers of adults.

On 13 November 2012, Deputy Prime Minister Nick Clegg announced plans to extend the right to request flexible working to all employees, this legislation took effect in April 2014. Lawyers have suggested that this will lead to "major headaches" for employers.

Now being enforced by the law on 30 June 2014, industrial reports concentrate on workers' right to request for flexible working and how it is guided by Advisory, Conciliation and Arbitration Service (ACAS). They explained how this code is designed to help employers, employees and their representatives to deal with disciplinary and grievance situations in the workplace.

Shift workers are generally excluded from flextime schemes as are senior managers. Other groups of workers for whom flextime arrangements are rare include those who serve the public during specific opening times.

The advantages of Flextime for the individuals include a better work–life balance, fewer commutes, less fatigue, more days off, lower sickness rates. The benefits for the company include; better motivated workers, more efficient and effective operation, less fatigued workers, so fewer errors; they get people working overtime hours without paying overtime rates, fewer facilities required, and lower sickness rates.

For employers, flextime can aid the recruitment and retention of staff. It has been a particularly popular option in 2009 for employers trying to reduce staff costs without having to make redundancies during the recession. It can also help provide staff cover outside normal working hours and reduce the need for overtime. Additionally flextime can also improve the provision of equal opportunities to staff unable to work standard hours.

Flextime can give employees greater freedom to organize their working lives to suit personal needs. In addition, travelling can be cheaper and easier if it is out of peak time.

United States 
In Florida, flextime workers, like salaried workers, are exempted from insurance regulations, and are given broad leeway in setting their own work schedule. Unlike exempted salaried workers, employers are still required to pay overtime to a flextime worker if they work more than 40 hours per week.

In recent years, the term "flextime" has acquired a more controversial definition when used to describe proposals to overhaul the nation's overtime regulations. Under one such proposal by the Bush administration made public on 5 August 2004, employers would not be required to pay non-exempt employees overtime for working more than 40 hours in a week so long as the employee works no more than 80 hours over a two-week period. For example, a worker could be required to work 70 hours one week and receive no overtime compensation as long as they work 10 hours or less the following week. Such arrangements are opposed by trade unions such as the AFL–CIO.

In certain industries and disciplines, such as information technology, flextime permits workers to vary their schedule. For example, they may opt to work four 10-hour days per week, taking Monday or Friday off. Another flextime schedule is to work nine-hour days Monday through Thursday, an eight-hour day on Friday, taking every other Friday off. Some agencies of the United States government allow employees to work such a schedule, and designate it as an alternative work schedule (AWS). Workers may arrange to coordinate their days off so that their responsibilities are adequately covered.

Other workers may opt simply to come in early, such as 5 or 6a.m., and leave in the mid-afternoon, or come in late and therefore leave late. One benefit of such a schedule is that commuting times occur outside of the congested rush hour traffic within a given geographic region. Flextime arrangements also help parents: one parent works 10a.m. – 6p.m. and is in charge of the children before school / daycare, while the other parent works 7a.m. – 3p.m. and is in charge of the children after school / daycare. This allows parents time to commute. Flextime is also beneficial to workers pursuing an education.

Australia 
Flexi-time in Australia is usually referred to accumulated overtime hours that an employee can build up and exchange for the equivalent amount of time off. (Example: Jane works 7a.m. – 3p.m. Monday to Friday. Over the past month, Jane has worked 8 hours overtime meaning she is eligible for a paid day off.)

If employees accumulate too many flex hours, they are required to perform a "flex burndown", as they are burning down the flex. Similarly, taking a flex day off is known as "flexing off".

It is implemented formally in the federal Australian Public Service and is available for staff in most state and territory government departments. With current changes to industrial relations laws (2006), from State to Federal level there are no new published guidelines (online) for flexi-time.

Recording working 
There are many different methods used for recording working time ranging from sophisticated software (computer programs) to handwritten time sheets. Most of these methods are associated with the payment of wages in return for hours worked. As a result, they often do not address a fundamental difference of most flexible working systems – namely the intention of flexible working to allow an employee to "trade hours" with their employer in return for a fixed wage.

Millennials 
"Millennial" is the name most commonly used to describe those born between 1980 and 2000. As the right to request for flexible working is extended to all by law, many benefits are expected to rise. With Millennials becoming the interest of many organisations, flexible working seems to attract them. As ethnic diversity and high level of education are their main characteristics, it is seen that Millennials are more likely to change their jobs more than the previous generation for economic reasons. Additionally, due to the delay in the retirement of baby boomers' generation, gaps in workforce were created, waiting for the Millennial generation to fill them.

Advantages and criticisms 

Flexible working is a pattern of working arrangements that enable employees to decide the time, duration, and location of their work. Flexible working patterns have gained the interest of both academics and industrial practitioners for some time, with implementation into law in certain countries as far back as 1930, but also in recent years. Existing literature highlights the fundamental importance of flexible working to both academics and organizations as a means of establishing a good work–life balance for employees; work–life balance for employees is theorized to increase employee efficiency, which in turns leads to increase in productivity of the organisation. This would also be suggested from research on the decreasing returns of working hours.

Academic literature has identified benefits of flexible working patterns to employees including life satisfaction, better wellbeing, a good work–life balance, and health benefits but some researchers argue that although there are such benefits, there are some negative effect such as work intensity, job insecurity associated with flexible working arrangement. Research works such as Evans et al., (2000) also highlight that flexible working pattern may not be applicable to all occupational fields, the authors also heighted the medical profession as one of such fields. A further critique is that some patterns of work deemed "flexible" such as a compressed work week may be put forward by the employer, rather than suiting the individual employee, and thus may not capture the same benefits as employee-chosen flexible working.

Industrial sources also have been able to highlight one of the positive effects of flexible working patterns as being able to attract highly qualified professionals, but Brookins established some negative effects flexible working patterns had to employers as it adds expenses and responsibility on the organisation, negative availability perspectives of employees on the customers, and employee availability.

Both academics and industrial sources were established that in some professions flexible working arrangement may not be available or its availability will have a negative perspective on employees by others with a non-flexible arrangement, example of such profession is the medical profession. The researcher done by Evans et al., (2000) on flexible working patterns in the medical profession emphasized how some medical doctors may attributes negative perception with colleagues with flexible working pattern. In 1930, Employees in the United Kingdom were given the right to request for flexible working arrangement, but there was no instructions or guideline on the way for this would work. Flexible working concept is also a relatively new form of working arrangement and this has limited its application in other parts of the world such as some region in Africa.

Flexible working patterns is a working arrangement that enable employees to determine the duration, time and location of their work. It has been seen both by academics and industrial sources to have benefit sure as increase of work–life balance for employee, which in turns leads to increase in productivity for the employer or organisation. Organisations hoping to adopt this form of working pattern for its employee should conduct research on how flexible working pattern can be successfully conducted, thus avoiding some of the expenses and pitfalls existing research has linked to flexible working practices.

Flexible working time accounts 
Flexible working time accounts is also known as deposited working-time accounts or work bank account system. It is derived from the German Federal Labor Government's reform program, which was passed by the German Federal Government on 21 August 2002. Then Federal Chancellor, Gerhard Schröder, announced that the program will invite the former director of human resources management of Volkswagen company, Peter Hartz, chaired the Labour Market Reform Committee. This program's goal is to make the rigidity of the labor system more flexible and to change the old social welfare policy, in order to lighten heavy financial burden.

Definitions
The concept of flexible working time accounts is to establish labor-self accounts, and labors can save their working hours, just like saving money, into their own accounts. The working hours in their accounts are their assets, so that employers and workers both sides can increase or decrease the work required by each other without affecting the salaries and welfare. While achieving the purpose of flexible labor, and the account-system may be short-term, long or permanent (life-time) of the convention.

Characteristics
Flexible working time accounts system has the following four characteristics
 Flexible working time accounts shall be calculated for at least the period of one year.
 The calculation of long-term account system is usually based on time and money, occasionally there may be passed on from other labors' accounts, the situation is only applicable to short-term working time.
 When using long-term working time accounts, there are two features can be used to classify:
 Optional long-term accounts  Most using of optional long-term accounts occur in the period that labors are still holding a post in their own company, labors can withdraw from accounts after negotiating between employers and labors, usually due to labors'personally needs.
 Aged-related long-term accounts  Aged-related long-term accounts can be used when labors'career get mature, preparing of early retirement. semi-retirement, or preparation of retirement.
 Unlike the short-term account system, there is the lowest limit standard of withdrawing hours, however, the setting of standard is according to different demand of labors.

See also 
 Effects of overtime
 Equal employment opportunity
 Fair Labor Standards Act of 1938 (United States)
 Four-day workweek
 Labour economics
 Labour market flexibility
 Office for National Statistics (UK)
 Remote work
 Time clock

References

External links 

 Advisory Conciliation and Arbitration Service (2006) 'Flexible working hours'
 
 The Legalities of Flextime
 

Working time
Human resource management
Labor history
Work–life balance